The Central District of Bardaskan County is a district (bakhsh) in Bardaskan County, Razavi Khorasan Province, Iran. At the 2006 census, its population was 33,105, in 9,313 families.  The district has one city: Bardaskan.  The district has two rural districts (dehestan): Kenarshahr Rural District and Kuhpayeh Rural District.

References 

Districts of Razavi Khorasan Province
Bardaskan County